The middle income trap is an economic development situation in which a country that attains a certain income (due to given advantages) gets stuck at that level. The term was introduced by the World Bank in 2006 and is defined by them as the 'middle-income range' countries with gross national product per capita that has remained between $1,000 to $12,000 at constant (2011) prices.

Origin of the term 
Economists Indermit Gill and Homi Kharas coined the term at World Bank in 2006 when they were working in the ground strategies for Eastern Asian economics. MIT is a new phenomenon and was first mentioned in 2007 in Gill and Kharas's World Bank report "An East Asian Renaissance: Ideas for Economic Growth".

Dynamics 
According to the concept, a country in the middle-income trap has lost its competitive edge in the export of manufactured goods due to rising wages, but is unable to keep up with more developed economies in the high-value-added market. As a result, newly industrialized economies such as South Africa and  Brazil have not, for decades, left what the World Bank defines as the 'middle-income range' since their per capita gross national product has remained between $1,000 to $12,000 at constant (2011) prices. They suffer from low investment, slow growth in the secondary sector of the economy, limited industrial diversification and poor labor market conditions and increasingly, aging populations.

From 1960 to 2010, only 15 out of 101 middle-income economies escaped the middle income trap, including Japan and the Four Asian Tigers: Hong Kong, Singapore, South Korea and Taiwan.

Avoidance 

Avoiding the middle income trap requires identifying strategies to introduce new processes and find new markets to maintain export growth. It is also important to increase domestic demand, because an expanding middle class can use its increasing purchasing power to buy high-quality, innovative products and help drive growth.

The biggest challenge is to move from resource-driven growth based on cheap labor and cheap capital to growth based on high productivity and innovation. This requires investments in infrastructure and education—building a high-quality education system that encourages creativity and supports breakthroughs in science and technology that can be applied back into the economy. Diversifying exports is also considered important to escape the middle income trap.

Criticism 

Other economists either find that there is no middle income trap  or claim that
debates about a “middle-income trap” appear anachronistic: middle-income countries have exhibited higher growth rates than all others since the
mid-1980s.

See also 
 Crony capitalism
 Dual-sector model
 Human capital
 Human Development Index
 Resource curse

References

Further reading 

 

 Russians are stuck in 'Middle Income Trap'

International finance
Development economics
2006 introductions